Samuel Weiss (born 1955) is a Canadian neurobiologist.

Samuel Weiss may also refer to:

 Samuel A. Weiss (1902–1977), American politician and NFL deputy commissioner
 Samuel Weiss (mobster) (c. 1904–?), New York mobster
 Sam Weiss, a character from the TV series Fringe